was a Japanese linguist and essayist. He is best known for his many contributions to Japanese linguistics and lexicography. In honor of him, the Shinmura Izuru Prize is annually awarded for contributions to linguistics.

Background 
Shinmura was born in Yamaguchi prefecture on October 4, 1876. He graduated from the Tokyo Imperial University in 1899 where he studied philology under the instruction of Ueda Kazutoshi. Between 1906 and 1909 he studied abroad in England, Germany, and France where he studied linguistics. In 1919 he received a Doctor of Letters.

Career 
In 1902, Shimura taught at Tokyo Higher Normal School, and in 1904 at Tokyo Imperial University. After returning from studying abroad, he taught at Kyoto Imperial University for a number of years.

Shinmura introduced western linguists to Japan and created the fundamental foundation of modern Japanese linguistics. His research included a study of the historical development of the Japanese language, a comparative study of Japanese with neighboring languages, and etymology. He also made important contributions to the study of 16–17th-century Christian missionaries in Japan.

In 1956 Shinmura was awarded the Order of Culture for his many contributions.

Major works 
 Nanban Sarasa, Kaizōsha, 1924
 Nanban Kōki, Iwanami Shoten, 1925
 Tōhō Gengoshi Sōkō, Iwanami Shoten, 1927
 Tōa Gogen Shi, Oka Shoin, 1930
 Genrin, Zenkoku Shobō, 1949
 Kōjien, Iwanami Shoten, 1955

Notes

References 
 
 
 
 

Linguists from Japan
Japanese essayists
Japanese Esperantists
Japanese expatriates in the United Kingdom
Japanese expatriates in Germany
Japanese expatriates in France
Recipients of the Order of Culture
Academic staff of Kyoto University
University of Tokyo alumni
People from Yamaguchi Prefecture
1876 births
1967 deaths